The 2019–20 Perth Scorchers Women's season was the fifth in the team's history. Coached by Lisa Keightley and captained by Meg Lanning, the Scorchers finished the regular season of WBBL05 in third place and qualified for finals. They were subsequently knocked out of the tournament by the Adelaide Strikers in an eight wicket semi-final loss at Allan Border Field.

Squad 
Each 2019–20 squad featured 15 active players, with an allowance of up to five marquee signings including a maximum of three from overseas. Australian marquees are players who held a national women's team contract at the time of signing for their WBBL|05 team.

Several personnel changes were made before and during the season, including:

 Elyse Villani, inaugural member and former captain of the Scorchers, moved back to her home state to play for the Melbourne Stars.
 Overseas marquee Nat Sciver returned to the Scorchers after not partaking in the previous season, replacing England teammate Kate Cross.
 Georgia Redmayne signed with the Scorchers, departing the Hobart Hurricanes.
 Jemma Barsby signed with the Scorchers after winning a WBBL championship with the Brisbane Heat.
 Ireland marquee Kim Garth, appearing in the league for the first time since winning a second championship with the Sydney Sixers, was announced as Perth's final overseas signing for the season.
 On 30 October, Lisa Keightley was appointed as head coach of the English women's team, though she would continue in her role at the Scorchers until the end of WBBL|05.
 On 11 November, the Scorchers announced the addition of Amy Edgar to the squad as a local replacement player for Piepa Cleary who was ruled out for the remainder of the tournament due to a fractured leg sustained a week earlier while fielding during a 20-run loss at the WACA.
 Overseas marquees Nat Sciver and Amy Jones would become unavailable towards the end of the season due to national team commitments, prompting calls from recently appointed CA Board member Mel Jones for greater cooperation between nations and better planning on scheduling.

The table below lists the Scorchers players and their key stats (including runs scored, batting strike rate, wickets taken, economy rate, catches and stumpings) for the season.

Ladder

Fixtures 
All times are local time

Regular season

Knockout phase

Statistics and awards 

 Most runs: Meg Lanning – 531 (4th in the league)
 Highest score in an innings: Meg Lanning – 101 (67) vs Hobart Hurricanes, 1 December
 Most wickets: Heather Graham – 15 (equal 11th in the league)
 Best bowling figures in an innings: Kim Garth – 3/21 (4 overs) vs Sydney Thunder, 12 November
 Most catches (fielder): Jemma Barsby, Heather Graham, Nat Sciver – 8 each (equal 4th in the league)
 Player of the Match awards:
 Amy Jones, Meg Lanning – 3 each
 Nat Sciver – 2
 Heather Graham – 1
 Scorchers Player of the Year: Nat Sciver
 WBBL|05 Player of the Tournament: Meg Lanning (equal 4th)
 WBBL|05 Team of the Tournament: Meg Lanning

References 

2019–20 Women's Big Bash League season by team
Perth Scorchers (WBBL)